Shaligram Yadav (2 January 1938 – 4 May 2021) was an Indian politician and former member of the Bihar Legislative Assembly. He was the representative from the Benipatti and Harlakhi Assembly constituency .

Early life 
Shaligram Yadav was born in Loma, Madhubani, on January 2, 1938, the  son of Devnandan Yadav and Ramraji Devi. He did his primary schooling from his hometown  and higher study from Bihar University, Muzaffarpur where he received a B.A. and a master's degree in Hindi in 1960.

After finishing his higher education he worked in a textile industry and later joined in politics and also social reforms.

Political career 
Shaligram Yadav began his political career from Congress party at  his late 40s. He was first elected for MLA in 1995 in independent candidacy from Benipatti, Madhubani, and  won two more times from Janata Dal (United) party in 2005 and 2010.

References 

1938 births
2021 deaths
People from Madhubani, India
Janata Dal (United) politicians
Babasaheb Bhimrao Ambedkar Bihar University alumni
Bihar MLAs 1995–2000
Bihar MLAs 2005–2010
Bihar MLAs 2010–2015